Dragon Force, also known as Powerforce, is a 1982 martial arts film that was directed by Michael Mak. It starred Bruce Baron, Frances Fong, Chi-Hung Chan, Sam Sorono, Yun Ho, Jackson Ng and Bruce Li.

Story
A princess is kidnapped by a general. An agent teams up with an international crime fighting organization called Dragon Force to rescue her.

Background
Mak's efforts paid off. They used script-writers with Western names as well as some cast members. The film was shown in 52 countries and made a good profit in the millions. The film was also shot originally in English. It is also called Power Force and Shen Tan Guang Tou Mei.

The story was written by Terry Chalmers, Dennis Thompsett and John Au Wa Hon.

References

External links
 Imdb: Dragon Force

Reviews
 City On Fire: Power Force | aka Dragon Force (1982) Review
 Moviecovers.com: Dragon Force cover
 Many Bruces: POWERFORCE

1982 films
1982 martial arts films
Hong Kong action films
1982 action films
Kung fu films
Hong Kong martial arts films
1980s English-language films
1980s Hong Kong films
English-language Hong Kong films